Kalateh-ye Abbas (also Romanized as Kalāteh-ye ‘Abbās) is a village in Qalandarabad Rural District, Qalandarabad District, Fariman County, Razavi Khorasan Province, Iran. At the 2006 census, its population was 71, in 14 families.

References 

Populated places in Fariman County